Johann Friedrich Hennert (19 October 1733 – 30 March 1813) was German-born and lectured in mathematics and physics at the University of Utrecht. He was a significant student of Leonhard Euler. He was known for his inclination towards the British school of philosophy.

Work
Hennert held the chair of mathematics at the University of Utrecht until 1805.

Hennert was an important figure in the history of Dutch mathematics. He wrote a number of textbooks on differential calculus.

Jan van Swinden was one of his most important students.

References

Helmers Dini M., Timmerman, Petronella Johanna de, in: Digitaal Vrouwenlexicon van Nederland.

External links

18th-century German mathematicians
19th-century German mathematicians
Number theorists
1733 births
1813 deaths
Mathematical analysts